DQS can refer to:

 Data Quality Services, a business intelligence service for Microsoft SQL Server
 DQS Holding GmbH, a German company providing assessments and certifications of management systems and processes (Deutsche Gesellschaft zur Zertifizierung von Qualitätssicherungssystemen). (Not to be confused with Deutsche Gesellschaft für Qualität or DGQ)
 de Quervain syndrome, a mucoid degeneration of two tendons that control movement of the thumb and their tendon sheath
 Ducati Quick Shift, a gear shift system used on the Ducati 848 and Ducati SuperSport which allows for upshifts without using the clutch lever for faster acceleration
 dQS, the derivative of quantity supplied (QS), a term used in quantity adjustment in market supply analysis within economics